Terminal Choice was a German industrial rock band. It was formed by singer Chris Pohl (also of Blutengel, Tumor, Pain of Progress and owner of the Fear Section label) in 1993.

History 
Their lyrics are sung in German and English. The sound was originally primarily electronic music, but with the 1998 album Navigator, guitars were added.

Besides Pohl, the original lineup included Jens Gärtner, who provided the drums and loops. In 1997, Manuel Selling was added as a guitar player.  He left in 2000 and Gordon Mocznay took over on guitar and bass guitar. Also in 2000, the band's album Ominous Future was ranked #15 on the German Alternative Charts (DAC) Top 50 Albums of 2000.

A year later in 2001, Louis Manke joined the band as well, adding a second guitar to the band. An album entitled "New Born Enemies" was released in 2006 and four years later the band released the album "Übermacht".

In 2017, Chris Pohl revealed in his biography that Terminal Choice is no longer active due to lack of time. No official statement has been released. The last release were the compilation albums Black Journey 1–3 released in 2011, the band's last gigs were in 2010.

Current members
Chris Pohl - Vocals (1993–2010)
Jens Gärtner - Drums (1997–2010)
Gordon Mocznay - Bass (2000–2010)
Louis Manke - Guitar (2001–2010)

Former members
 Manuel Selling - Bass (1997-2000)
 Sten Nitschke - Producer, Remixer (1997-2000) (he died in 2011)

Discography

Demo
1993: Terminal Choice
1994: Nightmare
1994: Facets of Pain
1994: Desiderius
1995: Degernerated Inclinations

Unlisted
1994: In Equal Shares / Split Tape
1994: Demonstrate The Power / titled as demo II

Full-length albums
1996: In the Shadow of Death
1998: Navigator
1999: Black Past (Rare - 1000 copies)
2000: Ominous Future – #15 DAC Top 50 Albums of 2000
2003: Buried a-Live (Live album)
2003: Menschenbrecher
2003: Reloadead ("Best of" album)
2006: New Born Enemies
2010: Übermacht
2011: Black Journey 1
2011: Black Journey 2
2011: Black Journey 3

EPs
1997: Khaosgott
1999: Venus
2002: Collective Suicide
2009: Keine Macht MCD

Singles
1995: Totes Fleisch
1998: Totes Fleisch Remixes
2000: No Chance – #39 DAC Top 100 Singles of 2000
2000: Fading
2000: Animal
2003: Injustice
2006: Don't Go – #11 DAC Singles

External links
 Official Website

References

German electronic music groups
Musical groups established in 1993
German electronic rock musical groups
German industrial rock musical groups
German industrial metal musical groups
German gothic rock groups